Gökhan is a Turkish forename meaning "ruler of the sky" related to Tengrism. The stem of the name comes from "gök"  ('sky') and han, a title held by hereditary rulers and tribal chiefs among Altaic-speaking peoples.

Most likely, the first appearance of the name Gökhan is as one of the six sons of Oghuz Khagan, the legendary ruler of the Oghuz.

Given name
Sports
 Gökhan Akkan, Turkish footballer of Çaykur Rizespor
 Gökhan Alsan, Turkish footballer for Samsunspor
 Gökhan Attaroğlu, Turkish swimmer
 Gökhan Bozkaya, Turkish footballer of Körfez FK
 Gökhan Çalışal, Turkish-German footballer of Yeni Malatyaspor
 Gökhan Değirmenci, Turkish footballer and goalkeeper for Akhisarspor
 Gökhan Emreciksin, Turkish footballer of Elazığspor
 Gökhan Erdogan, Turkish footballer of Darıca Gençlerbirliği
 Gokhan Gokgoz, Turkish volleyball player
 Gökhan Gönül, Turkish international footballer of Fenerbahçe SK
 Gökhan Gül, German footballer of Turkish origin 
 Gökhan Güleç, Turkish footballer of Kasımpaşa SK
 Gokhan Gumussu, Turkish footballer of Calcio Leinfelden-Echterdingen
 Gökhan Inler, Swiss-Turkish footballer who plays for Leicester City in England
 Gökhan Karadeniz, Turkish footballer for Hatayspor
 Gökhan Keskin, Turkish retired footballer of Beşiktaş JK and İstanbulspor
 Gökhan Kök, Turkish footballer of Sakaryaspor
 Gökhan Öner, Turkish volleyball player
 Gökhan Saki, Turkish-Dutch martial artist
 Gökhan Tokgöz, Turkish footballer of Bozüyükspor
 Gökhan Töre, Turkish international footballer of West Ham United F.C. 

 Gökhan Ünal, Turkish international footballer of Kayserispor on loan from Fenerbahçe SK
 Gökhan Yavaşer, Turkish freestyle wrestler
 Gökhan Zan, Turkish international footballer of Galatasaray SK
 Gökhan Tuğ, Doctor, Future Husband, Crown Prince of Hanımın Çiftliği

 Gökhan Birben, Turkish singer and artist of Hamsheni descent.
 Gökhan Alkan, Turkish actor and singer
 Gökhan Keser, Turkish actor, model and singer
 Gökhan Kırdar, Turkish film score composer
 Gökhan Özen, Turkish singer songwriter 
 Gökhan Özoğuz, Turkish ska punk singer from Athena

Others
 Gökhan Budak (1968–2013), Turkish professor of quantum physics
 Gökhan S. Hotamisligil, Turkish-American physician scientist

Surname
 Serdar Gökhan (born 1946), Turkish actor

See also
MV Karadeniz Powership Gökhan Bey, a ship

Turkish masculine given names